The Great Alibi is a 2008 French mystery film directed by Pascal Bonitzer. The screenplay is based on the 1946 Hercule Poirot crime novel The Hollow, written by Agatha Christie, although Poirot doesn't appear in this film version.

Cast
 Pierre Arditi as Henri Pages
 Miou-Miou as Éliane Pages
 Lambert Wilson as Pierre Collier
 Anne Consigny as Claire Collier
 Valeria Bruni Tedeschi as Esther Bachmann
 Mathieu Demy as Philippe Léger
 Maurice Bénichou as Le commandant Grange
 Caterina Murino as Léa Mantovani
 Céline Sallette as Marthe
 Agathe Bonitzer as Chloë
 Emmanuelle Riva as Geneviève Herbin
 Dany Brillant as Michel

References

External links 
 

2008 films
Films based on British novels
Films based on Hercule Poirot books
2000s mystery films
Films directed by Pascal Bonitzer
French mystery films
2000s French films